Suzanne Kathryn Longstaff (née Ellis, born 14 June 1969) is a British teacher and former rower.

Biography
Longstaff attended Abbots Bromley School and then Durham University, graduating in 1990 with a degree in Economics. She coxed for Durham University Women's Boat Club as a student. From 1991-1994 she was employed as an Advertising Manager at Haymarket Publishing.

She competed in the women's eight event at the 1996 Summer Olympics. She was the cox for the British crew that won the bronze medal in the women's eight at the 1997 World Championships. This was followed by teacher training at Homerton College, Cambridge.

Longstaff has been Headmistress of Putney High School since 2015.

References

External links
 

1969 births
Living people
British female rowers
Alumni of Trevelyan College, Durham
Alumni of Homerton College, Cambridge
Durham University Boat Club rowers
Olympic rowers of Great Britain
Rowers at the 1996 Summer Olympics
Sportspeople from Leamington Spa
World Rowing Championships medalists for Great Britain